Maryland Route 247 (MD 247) is a state highway in the U.S. state of Maryland.  Known as Loveville Road, the state highway runs  from MD 5 in Loveville north to Oakville Road in Oakville.  MD 247, which serves as a connector between MD 5 and MD 235 in northern St. Mary's County, was constructed in the early 1940s.

Route description

MD 247 begins at an intersection with MD 5 (Point Lookout Road) in Loveville.  The state highway heads north as a two-lane undivided road through farmland.  MD 247 intersects MD 235 (Three Notch Road) in Oakville before reaching its northern terminus at Oakville Road, the old alignment of MD 235.

History
MD 247 was constructed as a gravel road between 1940 and 1942.  Aside from repaving, the state highway has changed very little since.

Junction list

See also

References

External links

MDRoads: MD 247

247
Maryland Route 247